The Chinese Armed Forces may refer to:

 Armed Forces of the People's Republic of China (disambiguation)
 Republic of China Armed Forces, the armed forces of the Republic of China based on the island of Taiwan
 National Revolutionary Army of Kuomintang
 Military history of China